Jean Hazel Henderson ( Mustard; 27 March 1933 – 22 May 2022) was a British American futurist and environmental activist. As an autodidact in her twenties, having only a British high-school formal education, in the U.S. she gradually advanced, by virtue of groundbreaking citizen activism, into the roles of university lecturer and chair-holder, as well as that of advisor to corporations and government agencies. She authored several books including Building a Win-Win World, Beyond Globalization, Planetary Citizenship (with Daisaku Ikeda), and Ethical Markets: Growing the Green Economy.

Early life and education
Henderson was born on 27 March 1933, in Bristol, Somerset, England, the daughter of Kenneth and Dorothy May ( Jesseman) Mustard. She graduated from Clifton High School in 1950.

Career
After graduating from Clifton High School, she worked as a saleswoman, hotel clerk, and telephone operator.

In 1957, Henderson moved to New York City with her husband. She lived in an area of the city that was constantly covered in soot from garbage incinerators, forcing her to constantly wash the soot from her infant daughter. Her many complaints to city hall went nowhere, prompting her and Carolyn Konheim, another concerned parent, to form Citizens for Clean Air. The group made several early advances in clean air activism by lobbying for local, state, and federal pollution legislation. The group is responsible for getting the air pollution index featured in weather reporting. At its height, the group was composed of 20,000 members, with about 75 percent of them being women.

In the 1960s and 1970s, she wrote for Harvard Business Review. She advised the Office of Technology Assessment and the National Science Foundation from 1974 to 1980.

She was Regent's Lecturer at the University of California, Santa Barbara, and held the Horace Albright Chair in Conservation at the University of California, Berkeley, and worked as a travelling lecturer and panelist.

In 2004, Henderson started Ethical Markets Media, LLC, to disseminate information on green investing, socially responsible investing, green business, green energy, business ethics news, environmentally friendly technology, good corporate citizenship and sustainable development by making available reports, articles, newsletters and video gathered from around the world.

In 2007, Henderson published a book, Ethical Markets: Growing the Green Economy, which became the basis of the Ethical Markets television series on PBS.
She served on the boards of several publications, including Futures Research Quarterly, The State of the Future Report, E/The Environmental Magazine, Resurgence, and Foresight and Futures. She was a member of the World Future Society, the National Press Club, the Association for Evolutionary Economics, and a fellow of the World Futures Studies Federation. She was listed in Who's Who in the World, Who's Who in Science and Technology, and Who's Who in Business and Finance.

Awards and honours
In 1967, she was named "citizen of the year" by the New York County Medical Society.

In 1996, she received the Boston Research Center’s Global Citizen Award along with Adolfo Pérez Esquivel.

In 2007, Henderson was elected a Fellow of the Royal Society of Arts.

Henderson was awarded Honorary Doctor of Science degrees from the University of San Francisco, Soka University, and Worcester Polytechnic Institute.

Personal life
In 1957, she married Carter Henderson, a writer for The Wall Street Journal. Together they had a daughter. They divorced in 1981.

In 1996, she married Alan F. Kay, an internet pioneer and social entrepreneur who was the founder of the electronic Wall Street trading platform AutEx. He died in 2016.

Henderson died of skin cancer at her home in St. Augustine, Florida, on 22 May 2022.

Books 

Ethical Markets: Growing the Green Economy, Chelsea Green Publishing, 2006, 
Daisaku Ikeda coauthor, Planetary Citizenship, Middleway Press, 2004, 256 pgs
Hazel Henderson et al., Calvert-Henderson Quality of Life Indicators, Calvert Group, 2000, 392 pgs
Beyond Globalization. Kumarian Press, 1999, 88 pgs
Building a Win-Win World. Berrett-Koehler Publishers, 1995, 320 pgs
Creating Alternative Futures. Kumarian Press, 1996, 430 pgs (original edition, Berkley Books, NY, 1978)
Hazel Henderson et al., The United Nations: Policy and Financing Alternatives. Global Commission to Fund the United Nations, 1995, 269 pgs
Paradigms in Progress. Berrett-Koehler Publishers, 1995, 293 pgs (original edition, Knowledge Systems, 1991)
Redefining Wealth and Progress: New Ways to Measure Economic, Social, and Environmental Change : The Caracas Report on Alternative Development Indicators. Knowledge Systems Inc., 1990, 99 pgs
The Politics of the Solar Age. Knowledge Systems Inc., 1988, 433 pgs (original edition, Doubleday, NY, 1981)

See also

 Noosphere
 Solidarity economy
 Technology assessment

References

External links
HazelHenderson.com
 (video, 10min)
https://people.well.com/user/bbear/henderson.html

1933 births
2022 deaths
Anti-globalization writers
British women activists
British women economists
Deaths from cancer in Florida
Deaths from skin cancer
English economists
English non-fiction writers
Futurologists
Nautilus Book Award winners
Writers about activism and social change
Writers from Bristol